Epiphryne undosata is a moth of the family Geometridae. It is endemic to New Zealand.

Taxonomy
This species was first described by Baron Cajetan von Felder, Rudolf Felder and Alois Friedrich Rogenhofer in 1875 as Cidaria undosata.

Description
Hudson described the species as follows:

Host plants
Adult E. undosata feed from the flowers and assist with the pollination of Dracophyllum acerosum and Veronica salicifolia.

References

Moths of New Zealand
Endemic fauna of New Zealand
Cidariini
Moths described in 1875
Endemic moths of New Zealand